The Southeast Career Technical Academy (SECTA or Southeast Tech) is a magnet public high school in Las Vegas, Nevada. Opened as the Southern Nevada Vocational Technical Center in 1966, it was the first public educational institution of its kind launched by the Clark County School District. Its name was changed before the start of the 2007-2008 school year.

About
SECTA is a four-year comprehensive high school accredited by the Northwest Accreditation Commission, designed to offer career technical training programs with an academic curriculum. It is located on top of the Whitney Mesa Nature Preserve, which is right next to Thurman White Middle School. It is one of eight career technical academies in Las Vegas.

Majors offered
The academic majors include:

3D Animation for Film & Games
Architectural Engineering Drafting & Design
Automotive Service Technology
Internetworking Technology
Website Interactive Media
Cosmetology
Culinary Arts
Construction Engineering
Graphic Design & Illustration
Nurse Assisting
Sports Medicine
Photography
Teaching and education

Extracurricular activities
SECTA students won 13 Gold, 24 Silver, and 19 Bronze Medals in the 2012 SkillsUSA State Competition. It has the most College of Southern Nevada Tech Prep College Credits garnered in the state in 2011.

The school mascot is the Roadrunners. It competes in the Southeast Division of the Sunrise 4A Region in every sport sponsored by the Nevada Interscholastic Activities Association with the exceptions of football, track and field, and wrestling. In 2012, SECTA won the Nevada State titles in Men's Bowling, Men's Soccer, and Men's Volleyball. The school also fields swimming, basketball, and baseball teams.

Alumni

 Cameron Miller, member of the Nevada Assembly
 Kevin Rose, former partner at Google Ventures

References

External links

Clark County School District homepage

Clark County School District
Educational institutions established in 1966
Magnet schools in Nevada
Buildings and structures in Paradise, Nevada
School buildings completed in 1966
High schools in Clark County, Nevada
Public high schools in Nevada
1966 establishments in Nevada